The Hebert River is a tributary of Doda Lake, flowing into the municipality of Eeyou Istchee James Bay (municipality), in Jamésie, in the administrative region of Nord-du-Québec, Quebec, Canada.

The Hebert River flows entirely into the townships of Belmont, Royal, Espinay, Machault and Gradis. Forestry is the main economic activity of the sector; recreational tourism activities, second.

The Hébert River valley is served by the R1053 (east-west) forest road that runs north-west and north of Lac Hébert. This road joins the road R1009 (North-South direction) which passes to the East of the Eagle River (Lake Doda).

The surface of the Hebert River is usually frozen from early November to mid-May, however, safe ice circulation is generally from mid-November to mid-April.

Geography

Toponymy 
At various times in history, this territory has been occupied by the Attikameks, the Algonquins and the Crees. The term "Hebert" is a family name of French origin.

The toponym "Hébert River" was formalized on December 5, 1968, at the Commission de toponymie du Québec.

Notes and references

See also 

Rivers of Nord-du-Québec
Jamésie
Nottaway River drainage basin